The Brass Bottle is a 1914 British produced silent fantasy film based on Thomas Anstey Guthrie's 1900 novel of the same name. It was directed by Sidney Morgan. The film was a joint production between the British and Americans whereas it was produced by and has an all British cast but was distributed by the American World Film Company.

The film was remade in the United States by French director Maurice Tourneur in 1923 as The Brass Bottle. Both versions appear to be lost.

Cast
E. Holman Clark - Fakrash-al-Amash
Alfred Bishop - Professor Futvoye
Doris Lytton - Sylvia Futvoye
Lawrence Grossmith - Horace Ventmire
Tom Mowbray - Samuel Wackerbath
Joseph R. Tozer - King Solomon (*as J.R. Tozer)
Mary Brough - Mrs. Futovye
Vane Featherston -
Rudge Harding -
Molly Farrell -

References

External links
 The Brass Bottle @ IMDb.com

1914 films
British films based on plays
Films based on British novels
Films directed by Sidney Morgan
Films based on multiple works
World Film Company films
British black-and-white films
British fantasy films
British silent feature films
Lost British films
1910s fantasy films
1914 lost films
1910s British films